Mount Biederbick is the highest mountain of the Conger Range on Ellesmere Island, Nunavut, Canada. It lies in Quttinirpaaq National Park.

References

Arctic Cordillera
One-thousanders of Nunavut